Mette Nord (born 14 January 1959) is a Norwegian trade unionist and politician for the Labour Party.

She hails from Porsgrunn. She is a practical nurse by vocation, and became leader of the Telemark branch of the Norwegian Association of Health and Social Care Personnel. When this trade union merged in 2003 to form the Norwegian Union of Municipal and General Employees, she became deputy leader of the Telemark branch. She was elected national board member in 2005, deputy leader in 2009 and leader in 2013.

She was elected as a deputy representative to the Parliament of Norway from Telemark in 2005 and 2009, serving two terms. From December 2012 to September 2013 she served as a State Secretary in the Office of the Prime Minister as a part of Stoltenberg's Second Cabinet.

References

1959 births
Living people
Politicians from Porsgrunn
Norwegian trade unionists
Deputy members of the Storting
Labour Party (Norway) politicians
Politicians from Telemark
Norwegian state secretaries
Women members of the Storting
Norwegian women state secretaries